Mahesh Bhupathi and Andrew Kratzmann were the defending champions but only Kratzmann competed that year with Chris Haggard.

Haggard and Kratzmann lost in the first round to Leoš Friedl and Dominik Hrbatý.

Petr Pála and David Rikl won in the final 6–3, 5–7, 7–5 against Jaime Oncins and Daniel Orsanic.

Seeds
Champion seeds are indicated in bold text while text in italics indicates the round in which those seeds were eliminated.

  Petr Pála /  David Rikl (champions)
  Jaime Oncins /  Daniel Orsanic (final)
  Bob Bryan /  Mike Bryan (quarterfinals)
  David Adams /  Grant Stafford (first round)

Draw

External links
 2001 International Raiffeisen Grand Prix Doubles Draw

Hypo Group Tennis International
2001 ATP Tour